Early parliamentary elections were held in Austria on 23 November 1986. They were called by Chancellor Franz Vranitzky of the Socialist Party (SPÖ), as he was not prepared to continue the coalition government with new Freedom Party (FPÖ) leader Jörg Haider, who had ousted Norbert Steger at the party convention.

The SPÖ won the most seats, and formed a grand coalition with the Austrian People's Party (ÖVP), as neither were willing to work with Haider. The Green Alternative won eight seats, marking the first time a party other than the SPÖ, ÖVP and FPÖ had entered parliament since 1959 election. Voter turnout was 90%.

Results

References

Elections in Austria
Austria
Legislative
Austria